"Keep Coming Back" is a song by American singer-songwriter Richard Marx. It appears on his third solo album, Rush Street, and was both written and produced by Marx. The lyrics to the song detail a man's unrequited love for a woman. Working with musicians such as Luther Vandross (who added backing vocals to the track) and keyboardist Greg Phillinganes, Marx sought to explore different musical territory with this single, stating that "I wanted to write an old-fashioned R&B song."

The song became Marx's 10th top-40 hit in the United States, reaching number five in Cash Box magazine and peaking at number 12 on the Billboard Hot 100 chart in late 1991. It also spent four weeks atop the Billboard Adult Contemporary chart, reached number three in Canada, and topped the Canadian Adult Contemporary chart for five weeks (two weeks if not counting the holiday period in which no charts were published).

Additional releases
 Marx also recorded a Spanish-language version of the song as "Volver A Ti" (Keep Coming Back En Español) on the album, Lo Mejor- Especialmente Para Chile (Capitol 1992).
 "Keep Coming Back" also appears on Marx', 2012 album and DVD (televised performance) box-set, A Night Out With Friends, with Marx and Sara Niemietz performing a live duet.

Track listings

US 7-inch single
A. "Keep Coming Back" (edit) – 4:49
B. "I Get No Sleep" – 3:44

US cassette single
 "Keep Coming Back"
 "Playing with Fire" (sample)
 "Superstar" (sample)
 "Calling You" (sample)

US and Canadian CD single
 "Keep Coming Back" (LP version) – 6:51
 "Keep Coming Back" (AOR mix featuring Eric Johnson) – 5:26
 "Keep Coming Back" (Spanish version) – 6:46
 "Superstar" (LP version) – 4:42

UK 7-inch single
A. "Keep Coming Back" (edit)
B. "Superstar"

UK 12-inch single
A1. "Keep Coming Back"
B1. "Keep Coming Back" (quiet storm mix)
B2. "Superstar"

UK CD single
 "Keep Coming Back" (edit) – 4:49
 "Keep Coming Back" (AOR mix featuring Eric Johnson) – 5:26
 "Keep Coming Back" (Spanish version) – 6:46

Australasian cassette single and Japanese mini-CD single
 "Keep Coming Back"
 "Superstar"

Personnel
 Richard Marx – lead vocals 
 Michael Egizi – keyboards 
 Greg Phillinganes – Fender Rhodes
 Bruce Gaitsch – guitars 
 Nathan East – bass 
 Jonathan Moffett – drums 
 Steve Grove – saxophone 
 Luther Vandross – backing vocals

Charts

Weekly charts

Year-end charts

See also
 List of Hot Adult Contemporary number ones of 1991 and 1992 (U.S.)

References

1991 singles
1991 songs
Capitol Records singles
Richard Marx songs
Songs written by Richard Marx